The New Monthly Magazine was a British monthly magazine published from 1814 to 1884. It was founded by Henry Colburn and published by him through to 1845.

History
Colburn and Frederic Shoberl established The New Monthly Magazine and Universal Register as a "virulently Tory" competitor to Sir Richard Phillips' Monthly Magazine in 1814. "The double-column format and the comprehensive contents combined the Gentleman's Magazine with the Annual Register".

In its April 1819 issue it published John Polidori's Gothic fiction The Vampyre, the first significant piece of prose vampire literature in English, attributing it to Lord Byron, who partly inspired it.

In 1821 Colburn recast the magazine with a more literary and less political focus, retitling it The New Monthly Magazine and Literary Journal. Nominally edited by the poet Thomas Campbell, most editing fell to the sub-editor Cyrus Redding. Colburn paid contributors well, and they included Sydney Morgan, Thomas Charles Morgan, Peter George Patmore, Mary Shelley, Charles Lamb, Leigh Hunt, Stendhal, Thomas Noon Talfourd, Letitia Elizabeth Landon, Felicia Hemans, Ugo Foscolo, Richard Lalor Sheil, Mary Russell Mitford, Edward Bulwer, James and Horace Smith, and William Hazlitt. Hazlitt's "Table-Talk" essays, begun in the London Magazine, appeared in the New Monthly from late 1821, his essay "The Fight" appeared in 1822, and his series "The Spirits of the Age'" was later republished, with essays from other sources, in the book The Spirit of the Age (1825).

Charles Knight's London Magazine merged with the New Monthly in 1829, and in that year Richard Bentley became Colburn's business partner. After Redding resigned in 1830, Campbell found himself unable to edit the magazine on his own and Samuel Carter Hall became editor for a year. In 1831 the novelist Edward Bulwer became editor, turning "the essentially apolitical, slightly Whiggish, literary journal into a vigorous radical organ shouting 'Reform' at the top of its lungs." Hall, a political Conservative, had remained as sub-editor, and resisted Bulwer's efforts: Bulwer resigned in 1833, with Hall taking up the editorship once more. Contributors now included Catherine Gore, Anna Maria Hall, Letitia Elizabeth Landon, Felicia Hemans, Caroline Norton, Thomas Haynes Bayly, and Theodore Edward Hook.

In 1837 the magazine was retitled The New Monthly Magazine and Humorist, to meet the challenge of Bentley's Miscellany. Now edited by Theodore Hook, it published contributions from Leigh Hunt, Douglas Jerrold, Frederick Marryat, Frances Trollope, Charles Robert Forrester, and W. M. Thackeray. Upon Hook's death in 1841, Thomas Hood was editor until 1843.

In 1845 Colburn sold the magazine for £2500 to William Harrison Ainsworth, who had earlier edited Bentley's Miscellany and who now edited his own Ainsworth's Magazine. Ainsworth edited the New Monthly with his cousin William Francis Ainsworth as sub-editor. From 1871–79 William Francis Ainsworth was editor.

Titles
Over the years, the magazine had several titles. These are listed at Periodicals Online, and comprise:
The New Monthly Magazine and Universal Register – February 1814 to December 1820
The New Monthly Magazine and Literary Journal – January 1821 to December 1836
The New Monthly Magazine and Humorist – January 1837 to December 1852
The New Monthly Magazine – January 1853 to December 1881
The New Monthly – January to October 1882.

Editors
The editorship of the New Monthly Magazine was complicated by the frequent use of a deputy position, or "working editor". Hook, Hood, Ainsworth, and Ainsworth alone are named on bound volume title pages.

1814 Frederic Shoberl
John Watkins
1819 Alaric Alexander Watts
1821 Edward Dubois, one issue only
1821–1830 Thomas Campbell
1821–1830 Cyrus Redding de facto editor
1830 Samuel Carter Hall, sub-editor and then editor
1831–1833 Edward Bulwer-Lytton
1837–1841 Theodore Hook
1837–1841 Benson Earle Hill, assistant
1841–1843 Thomas Hood
1841–1853 Peter George Patmore
1845–1870 William Harrison Ainsworth proprietor-editor
1871 William Francis Ainsworth

References

Further reading
Many earlier editions of this publication are now available online. Later volume numbering is sequential by year. In earlier publications, at least one example is to be found of multiple volume numbering in the same year, such as 1822, per examples listed below. The list also illustrates the titles used, and gives an indication of the publishing frequency.
 David Higgins, 'Englishness, Effeminacy, and the New Monthly Magazine: Hazlitt’s “The Fight” in Context’, Romanticism 10:2 (Autumn 2004), 170–90
 The New Monthly Magazine, and Universal Register, Vol 6. July–Dec 1816 at Google Books.
The New Monthly Magazine and Literary Journal. Vol 3. Jan–June 1822 at Google Books.
The New Monthly Magazine and Literary Journal. 1822. Vol 4. Original Papers at Google Books.
The New Monthly Magazine and Literary Journal. 1822. Vol 5. Original Papers at Google Books.
The New Monthly Magazine and Literary Journal. 1822. Vol 6. Historical Register at Google Books.
The New Monthly Magazine and Literary Journal. 1823. Vol 9. Historical Register at Google Books.
 The New Monthly Magazine and Literary Journal. Vol 9. Jan–June 1825 at Google Books.
 The New Monthly Magazine and Literary Journal. Vol 16 Part 1, 1826 at Google Books
 The New Monthly Magazine and Literary Journal. Vol 21 Part 3, 1827 at Google Books
 The New Monthly Magazine and Humorist. Vol 36, Part 2. 1839 at Google Books.
 The New Monthly Magazine and Humorist. Vol 71, Part 2. 1844 at Google Books.
 The New Monthly Magazine and Humorist. Vol 72, Part 3. 1844 at Google Books.
The New Monthly Magazine and Humorist. Vol 88. 1850 at Google Books.
The New Monthly Magazine and Humorist. Vol 89. 1850 at Google Books.
The New Monthly Magazine and Humorist. Vol 90. 1850 at Google Books.
The New Monthly Magazine and Humorist. Vol 91. 1851 at Google Books.
The New Monthly Magazine and Humorist. Vol 93. 1851 at Google Books.
The New Monthly Magazine and Humorist. Vol 94. 1852 at Google Books.
The New Monthly Magazine and Humorist. Vol 96. 1852 at Google Books.
The New Monthly Magazine . Vol 97. 1853 at Google Books.
The New Monthly Magazine . Vol 99. 1853 at Google Books.
The New Monthly Magazine. Vol 100. 1854 at Google Books.
 The New Monthly Magazine. Vol 101. May 1854 at Google Books.
The New Monthly Magazine. Vol 102. 1854 at Google Books.
The New Monthly Magazine. Vol 103. 1855 at Google Books.
The New Monthly Magazine. Vol 105. 1855 at Google Books.
The New Monthly Magazine. Vol 106. 1856 at Google Books.
 The New Monthly Magazine. Vol 108. 1856 at Google Books.
The New Monthly Magazine. Vol 135. 1865 at Google Books.
The New Monthly Magazine. Vol 136. 1866 at Google Books.
 The New Monthly Magazine. Vol 138. 1866 at Google Books.
The New Monthly Magazine. Vol 139. 1867 at Google Books.
 The New Monthly Magazine. Vol 142. 1868 at Google Books.
The New Monthly Magazine. Vol 145. 1869 at Google Books. The last volume for which full views are available, thereafter only snippet views are available per below.
The New Monthly Magazine. Vol 146. 1870. Snippet view at Google Books.

External links
Listings for New Monthly Magazine at Internet Archive – primarily the American Harper's New Monthly Magazine (Harper's Magazine, from 1850)

1814 establishments in the United Kingdom
1884 disestablishments in the United Kingdom
Monthly magazines published in the United Kingdom
Defunct literary magazines published in the United Kingdom
Magazines established in 1814
Magazines disestablished in 1884